KRT84 is a keratin gene, for a type II hair keratin contained primarily in the filiform tongue papilla.

References